Mick Cooke (born 15 December 1973) is a Scottish muli-instrumentalist who was the trumpet player of the indie band Belle & Sebastian for fifteen years before leaving in 2013 to concentrate on composing full-time.

Besides trumpet, Cooke plays other brass instruments, including the French horn, and occasionally plays electric guitar and bass live.

Cooke was a founding member of Belle & Sebastian, although he did not officially join until their third album (he was prevented from doing so because his other band, Hardbody, was under contract with Sony). Whilst he was known to sing at some concerts (including a rendition of "This Guy's In Love With You"), the only official Belle & Sebastian release with Cooke on lead vocals is "The Monkeys Are Breaking Out of The Zoo", from the charity compilation Colours Are Brighter.

Cooke also plays in the ska band The Amphetameanies and appeared on the 2007 Idlewild album, Make Another World. He has worked as an arranger for artists such as Franz Ferdinand, Phil Cunningham, and Jason Donovan. He is said to have had an influence on other Scottish-based bands, including Franz Ferdinand (who incidentally were given a bass guitar by Mick, leading to the formation of the band), whose members appeared in Belle & Sebastian's enigmatic early promotional photographs.

Cooke now composes music for films, theatre, and animations. He worked as composer on Boj for CBeebies, and on Zack & Quack for Nick Jr. His theatre work includes the score for Cannibal Women Of Mars which played at the Tron Theatre in Glasgow in 2013.

References

External links
Mick Cooke's website

1973 births
Living people
Scottish trumpeters
Male trumpeters
Belle and Sebastian members
British indie pop musicians
People educated at Harris Academy